Maltinerava (also Île Pénoui, Île Pénouni) is a small uninhabited island in Sanma Province of Vanuatu in the Pacific Ocean.

Geography
Maltinerava lies off the eastern coast of Espiritu Santo. The estimated terrain elevation above sea level is 38 meters.

References

Islands of Vanuatu
Sanma Province
Uninhabited islands of Vanuatu